This page shows the results of the Karate Competition for men and women at the 1995 Pan American Games, held from March 11 to March 26, 1995 in Mar del Plata, Argentina. There were eleven events, for both men (seven) and women (four), in this inaugural Pan Am event.

Men's competition

Men's Kata

Men's Kumite (– 66 kg)

Men's Kumite (– 72 kg)

Men's Kumite (– 80 kg)

Men's Kumite (+ 80 kg)

Men's Kumite (Open Class)

Men's Kumite (Team)

Women's competition

Women's Kata

Women's Kumite (– 53 kg)

Women's Kumite (+ 53 kg)

Women's Kumite (Team)

Medal table

References

 Sports 123

Events at the 1995 Pan American Games
1995
1995 in karate